Permaculture College Australia Inc is a not-for-profit sustainability training organisation which conducts the accredited vocational training and community education programs in permaculture at Djanbung Gardens in Nimbin, New South Wales.

The full-time APT Certificate III, IV and Diploma in Permaculture are AUSTUDY approved for Australians, who may apply for a student living allowance.

Permaculture College Australia leases the training facilities and demonstration farm at Djanbung Gardens as its campus. PCA also conducts permaculture courses at other campuses in Australia and overseas.

See also
Robyn Francis

References

External links
Permaculture College Australia

Permaculture organizations
Agricultural organisations based in Australia
Australian tertiary institutions
2004 establishments in Australia
Organizations established in 2004